Constantine III Leichoudes (? – 9 August 1063) was the Ecumenical Patriarch of Constantinople from 1059 to 1063.

Born in Constantinople, he was a fellow student of Michael Psellus and John Xiphilinus. He rose to high court offices: appointed protovestiarios, he later became proedros ("president") of the Senate and was one of the senior aides of emperors Michael V and Constantine IX. He also became abbot of the imperial Mangana Monastery, and in 1059, following the dismissal of Michael I Cerularius, he was elected into the patriarchal office, which he held until his death. He is considered a saint of the Eastern Orthodox Church, and is commemorated on 29 July.

11th-century patriarchs of Constantinople
1063 deaths
Byzantine saints of the Eastern Orthodox Church
People from Constantinople
Protovestiarioi
Year of birth unknown
Byzantine abbots